Kuda Caves are located in the small village of Kuda, on the eastern side of the north shore of Murud-Janjira  in south Konkan, India. These fifteen Buddhist caves are small, simple, and were excavated in first century BCE.

The verandah of Chaitya has several reliefs of the Buddha, carved with symbols of lotus, wheel and Nagas. Later in 5th/6th century CE, the Buddhist branch of the Mahayana took over the caves and added their sculptures. The first cave has ancient writing on its wall. The sixth cave entrance is adorned with elephants.

The thirty inscriptions describe donations by lay Buddhists and Buddhist monks. Other donors include an iron monger, a banker, a gardener, a writer, physician, a flower vendor and a minister.

References

Other websites

Buddhist caves in India
Caves of Maharashtra
Indian rock-cut architecture
Former populated places in India
Buddhist pilgrimage sites in India
Buddhist monasteries in India
Buddhist temples in India
Caves containing pictograms in India